The ochraceous bulbul (Alophoixus ochraceus) is a species of songbird in the bulbul family, Pycnonotidae. It is found from Southeast Asia to Sumatra. It is usually found in the mid-storey of broad-leaved evergreen and rainforests up to 1500 metres elevation.

Taxonomy and systematics
The ochraceous bulbul was originally described in the genus Criniger until moved to the genus Alophoixus in 2009. Alternate names for the ochraceous bulbul include the brown white-throated bulbul and ochraceous bearded-bulbul.

Subspecies
Six subspecies are recognized:
 A. o. hallae - (Deignan, 1956): Found in southern Vietnam	
 A. o. cambodianus - (Delacour & Jabouille, 1928): Found in eastern Thailand and south-western Cambodia
 A. o. ochraceus - (Moore, F, 1854): Found in southern Myanmar and south-western Thailand
 A. o. sordidus - (Richmond, 1900): Originally described as a separate species in the genus Criniger. Found on central Malay Peninsula
 A. o. sacculatus - (Robinson, 1915): Found on southern Malay Peninsula
 A. o. sumatranus - (Wardlaw-Ramsay, RG, 1882): Originally described as a separate species in the genus Criniger. Found in western Sumatra

References

ochraceous bulbul
Birds of Cambodia
Birds of the Malay Peninsula
Birds of Sumatra
ochraceous bulbul
Taxonomy articles created by Polbot